Boden Municipality (Swedish: Bodens kommun) is a municipality in Norrbotten County in northern Sweden. Its seat is located in Boden.

In 1919 the evolving garrison town of Boden was detached from Överluleå and instituted as a city municipality of its own. In 1967 the rest of Överluleå was merged into the city together with a part of Råneå. In 1971 Edefors (which in 1892 also had been detached from Överluleå) was added and the present municipality was formed.

History
According to recent finds, the oldest human settlements are believed to be from around 5,000 BC. From this early time nothing is known (except some scarce finds). First accounted-for sources are from the 16th century, when Boden is referred to as Bodebyn or Bodarna, which may refer to the sheds (bod means "shed"). In 1543 there were seven farmers in the community (each farmer at that time might have several workers and a family). It was also mentioned that native Sami people were living in the proximity.

Geography
Luleå is the largest city in Norrbotten County and hosts the main campus of Luleå University of Technology.

The main northern railway line, Stambanan genom övre Norrland, ends in Boden. By rail, Boden is connected to Luleå, and, on the same line, Uppsala, Stockholm, and finally Bräcke in the south.

Localities
There were six localities in the municipality as of 2018:

Language
In Boden Municipality, as in all of Sweden, there is no "official" language, but Swedish is by far the mostly used one. Some people are also, due to the proximity to the Finnish border, proficient in Finnish, and a few speak Sami. Nowadays, due to immigration, a lot of languages from around the world can also be heard.

International relations

Twin towns — Sister cities
Boden Municipality is twinned with:
 Alta, Norway
 Oulu, Finland (since 1948)
 Apatity, Russia

All of these are northerly located, only Oulu being on a more southern latitude than Boden.

Notable natives
Peter Englund, author, historian (tenth member of the Swedish Academy)
Berit Granquist, fencer
Eyvind Johnson, author (awarded the Nobel Prize in Literature in 1974)
Niclas Wallin, ice hockey player (team member of the winner of the 2006 Stanley Cup Playoffs, the Carolina Hurricanes)
Tobias "Tejbz" Öjerfalk, online personality.

Politics
Following 2018 elections the municipal council is dominated by the Social Democrats despite their losing two seats compared to the previous elections. Two regional parties, Aktiv samling – Bodenalternativet and Health Care Party of Norrbotten, performed well, gaining 10 seats between them in the 49-member council. The head of executive is Social Democrat Claes Nordmark.

See also
English Canal
Boden Fortress

References

External links

Boden Municipality - Official site 
ExperienceBoden.nu - Official tourist site

 
Municipalities of Norrbotten County